Thompson Island (variant: Twer-oong Island) is an uninhabited island off the shore of Baffin Island located in the Arctic Archipelago in the territory of Nunavut. The island lies in Frobisher Bay, south of Faris Island and Hill Island.

References 

Islands of Frobisher Bay
Uninhabited islands of Qikiqtaaluk Region